Santo Domingo is a station on Line 2 of the Madrid Metro. It is located in fare Zone A.

History
The station opened on 21 October 1925.

References 

Line 2 (Madrid Metro) stations
Railway stations in Spain opened in 1925